Burntheath is a hamlet in Derbyshire, England. It is located 1 mile north of Hilton, and adjacent to the A50 road.

Hamlets in Derbyshire
South Derbyshire District